The Battle of Palkhed was fought on February 28, 1728 at the village of Palkhed, near the city of Nashik, Maharashtra, India between the Maratha Empire and the Nizam-ul-Mulk, Asaf Jah I of Hyderabad wherein, the Marathas defeated the Nizam.

Background
The seeds of this battle go to the year 1713, when Maratha king Shahu, appointed Balaji Vishwanath as his Peshwa or Prime Minister. Within a decade, Balaji had managed to extract a significant amount of territory and wealth from the fragmenting Mughal Empire. In 1724, Mughal control lapsed, and Asaf Jah I, the 1st Nizam of Hyderabad declared himself independent of Mughal rule, thereby establishing his own kingdom known as Hyderabad Deccan.

The Nizam set about strengthening the province by attempting to control the growing influence of the Marathas. He utilized a growing polarization in the Maratha Empire due to the claim of the title of King by both Shahu and Sambhaji II of Kolhapur. The Nizam began supporting the Sambhaji II faction, which enraged Shahu who had been proclaimed as King. The Nizam further decided to halt Chauth given by many landowners of the Deccan province to the Marathas, as had been agreed by the Syed Brothers in 1719.

Prelude 

The battle plan was set by the withdrawal of Baji Rao's army from the southern reaches of the Maratha empire during May 1727. This was followed by Shahu breaking off negotiations with the Nizam-ul-Mulk about the restoration of the Chauth.

The Nizam pursued Baji Rao's army around the vicinity of Pune for about six months, where Baji Rao executed a series of thrust and parry moves to finally corner the Nizam at Palkhed.

The Battle
Baji Rao and the Maratha armies were called back from the south, from the Karnataka campaign. In May 1727, Baji Rao then asked Shahu to break off negotiations with Nizam-ul-Mulk, Asaf Jah I (Nizam-ul-Mulk had called for arbitration over the payment of the Chauth and sardeshmukhi) and started mobilizing an army. With the monsoons over and the land ready for this exciting campaign, Baji Rao moved towards Aurangabad.

After a skirmish near Jalna (the Marathas by now had become famous for their strategy of not engaging with the enemy) with Iwaz Khan (the General of Nizam-ul-Mulk), as could have been predicted, Baji Rao moved away from the battlefield, towards Burhanpur.

Nizam-ul-Mulk’s army pursued Baji Rao. Baji Rao then moved westwards to Gujarat from North Khandesh. However, the Nizam-ul-Mulk gave up the pursuit and moved southward towards Pune. This is an interesting reason and comparison between how the two armies functioned. The Nizam is known to have carried huge armies with him, including supplies to last for the duration of the campaign. In fact, the Nizam used to carry his jenana or womenfolk with him during his campaigns. The Maratha armies, however, were very light and found supplies on the way by plundering and looting outposts on the way.

As Nizam-ul-Mulk left the pursuit of Baji Rao and moved towards the headquarters of the Shahu stronghold, posts like Udaipur, Avasari, Pabal, Khed, and Narayangarh surrendered to Nizam-ul-Mulk, who then occupied Pune and advanced towards Supa, Patas, and Baramati.

Sambhaji II's Withdrawal
In Baramati, Nizam-ul-Mulk got news of Baji Rao moving towards Aurangabad. Nizam-ul-Mulk began moving northwards to intercept the Maratha Army. By this time he was confident of crushing Baji Rao and his army. It was not to happen so. The Raja of Kolhapur, Sambhaji II refused to join him in this campaign against Baji Rao. The Nizam was cornered in a waterless tract near Palkhed on 25 February 1728. Through Iwaz Khan, the Nizam-ul-Mulk sent out a word of his plight, and his army was allowed to move to the vicinity of the river. The Mughal emperor Farrukhsiyar appointed Nizam-ul-Mulk as Subedar of Deccan.

Outcome
The Nizam of Hyderabad was defeated by the Marathas, and Peshwa Baji Rao I made him sign a peace treaty on 6 March 1728 at the village of Mungi-Paithan.

By the treaty of Munji Shivagaon, the Nizam agreed to make certain concessions to the Peshwa.

 Chhatrapati Shahu was recognised as the sole Maratha ruler.
 Marathas were given the right to collect Chauth and Sardeshmukhi of Deccan.
 Those revenue collectors driven out would be reappointed.
 The balance revenue was to be paid to Chhatrapati Shahu.

References

Further reading
 Montgomery, Bernard Law. A Concise History of Warfare, Great Britain: William Collins Sons, 1968, pg. 132
 Palsolkar, Col. R. D., The life of an outstanding Indian Cavalry commander - 1720-1760 the Peshwa., India: Reliance Publishers, 248pp, 1995, .
 Paul, E. Jaiwant. Baji Rao - The Warrior Peshwa, India:Roli Books Pvt Ltd, 184pp, .

External links
 Atul Sabnis' excellent article on the battle
 Wars of the Mogul Empire

Palkhed
Palkhed 1728
1728 in India